Soultz-Haut-Rhin is a commune in the Haut-Rhin département in Grand Est in north-eastern France.

Its inhabitants are called Soultziens (male) or Soultziennes (female).

Geography
The town of Soultz-Haut-Rhin has an enclave located northeast of Goldbach-Altenbach.

The town of Soultz was built around a salted water source from which originates its name.

History
The origins of Soultz go back to the 7th century.

667 : the written name of Sulza (salted source) is mentioned in a donation from Adalrich, Duke of Alsace, father of Saint Odile, of the bann of Soultz to the convent of Ebersmunster.

Demography

Places of interest
Soultz has houses from the 15th, 16th, 17th and 18th centuries.
 The Church of Saint-Maurice is a Gothic building (1270–1489)
 Château de Buchenek is a 13th-century castle, now a museum
 La Nef des Jouets (The Toys Vessel, museum of toys)
 The 1860 town hall is a Renaissance Revival building

People
 Georges-Charles de Heeckeren d'Anthès, who married Catherine Gontcharoff, eldest sister of Alexander Pushkin's wife, and killed Pushkin in a duel.
 Auguste-César West (1810–1880), prefect of Haut-Rhin from 1848 to 1850 then prefect of Bas-Rhin until 1855 and of Haute-Garonne until 1859.
 Bernard Genghini, footballer, born in 1958 in Soultz
 Pierre Villon (1901–1980), whose real name was Pierre Ginsburger, was a French political figure who took part in the Resistance.
 Katia Krafft, volcanologist, born in 1942 in Soultz. Wife of the volcanologist Maurice Krafft. Both of them were carried off in 1991 by a pyroclastical flow on the sides of the Mount Unzen (Japan).

See also
 Communes of the Haut-Rhin department

References

External links

 Soultz-Haut-Rhin on the INSEE website

Communes of Haut-Rhin
Soultz-Haut-Rhin